Indian Harbour may refer to the following places:
Indian Harbour, Newfoundland and Labrador
Indian Harbour, Nova Scotia
Indian Harbour, former name of Port Hilford, Nova Scotia
Indian Harbour Beach, Florida
Indian Harbour Lake, Nova Scotia